Palmi may refer to:

People

Given name
Palmi is an Icelandic male given name. Notable people with this surname include:
 Pálmi Gestsson (born 1957), Icelandic actor and voice actor
 Pálmi Gunnarsson (born 1950), Icelandic musician
 Pálmi Hannesson (1898–1956), Icelandic naturalist
 Pálmi Jónsson (1923–1991), Icelandic entrepreneur
 Pálmi Jónsson (1929–2017), Icelandic politician
 Pálmi Rafn Pálmason (born 1984), Icelandic football player

Surname
  (born 1964), German table tennis player
 Topias Palmi (born 1994), Finnish basketball player

Places
 Palmi, Calabria

Species
 Mordellistena palmi, species of beetle in the genus Mordellistena of the family Mordellidae
 Pristiorhynchus palmi
 Thrips palmi, insect from the genus Thrips in the order Thysanoptera